Paula Red (or Paulared) is an apple cultivar that arose as a seedling next to an orchard of McIntosh trees. It ripens late in the summer.

Appearance and flavor 
Paulared apples are bright red with some yellow and tan spots; the skin often has a dusty sheen.  They have a sprightly taste, not too sweet and not too tart, vinous and slightly reminiscent of strawberries.  It has a firm white flesh that becomes soft and mealy extremely quickly as its season declines.  Paula Red apples are suitable for both eating fresh and cooking, although they become extremely soft when cooked, which suits them to some dishes (applesauce) and not others (pies).

History 
The first Paulared apple tree was discovered in 1960 by grower Lewis Arends near a McIntosh block in his orchard in Sparta Township, Kent County, Michigan.  He named the apple after his wife, Pauline.  Paulared apples appeared on the market in 1968.

Season 
The Paulared apple is available from late August into October.  It ripens with, and is often mistaken for, Tydeman's Early Worcester, another variety of McIntosh.

Notes

External links 

New York Apple Association description

Apple cultivars